Gorkovskoye is an urban locality (a work settlement) and the administrative center of Gorkovsky District of Omsk Oblast, Russia, located  northeast of Omsk. Population:

References

Urban-type settlements in Omsk Oblast